The Boise State Broncos football statistical leaders are individual statistical leaders of the Boise State Broncos football program in various categories, including passing, rushing, receiving, total offense, defensive stats, and kicking. Within those areas, the lists identify single-game, single-season, and career leaders. The Broncos represent Boise State University in the NCAA's Mountain West Conference (MW).

Although Boise State began competing in intercollegiate football as a 2-year college in 1933, the school's official record book only includes 1968 and later, when Boise State became a 4-year college.

These lists are dominated by more recent players for several reasons:
 Since 1968, seasons have increased from 10 games to 11 and then 12 games in length.
 Boise State has been in the same football conference as Hawaii since the Broncos joined the Western Athletic Conference in 2001, except in 2011 (Boise State's first MW season, with Hawaii still in WAC football). This is relevant because NCAA rules allow a team that plays at Hawaii to schedule an extra regular-season game. However, when Hawaii joined MW football in 2012, the two schools were placed in separate football divisions, which meant that the Broncos would only visit Hawaii once every four years. Additionally, while Boise State has been eligible to schedule an extra game twice since the teams were reunited in the MW (in 2012 and 2016), it did not do so in either season.
 Bowl games only began counting toward single-season and career statistics in 2002. The Broncos have qualified for bowl games in every season since then, giving players an extra game to accumulate statistics in all seasons except 2018, when their bowl game was suspended during the first quarter due to severe weather and ultimately canceled without play resuming; 2020, when the Broncos opted out of playing a bowl game amid the COVID-19 pandemic; and 2021, when COVID-19 issues within the program forced the Broncos to pull out of their scheduled bowl game.
 The Broncos have played in the MW Championship Game five times since its creation in 2013 (specifically in 2014, 2017, 2018, 2019, and 2020), giving players in those seasons yet another game to accumulate statistics.

These lists are updated through Boise State's game against New Mexico on September 9, 2022.

Passing

Passing yards

Passing touchdowns

Rushing

Rushing yards

Rushing touchdowns

Receiving

Receptions

Receiving yards

Receiving touchdowns

Total offense
Total offense is the sum of passing and rushing statistics. It does not include receiving or returns.

Total offense yards

Touchdowns responsible for
"Touchdowns responsible for" is the official NCAA term for combined rushing and passing touchdowns. It does not include receiving or returns.

Defense

Interceptions

Tackles

Sacks

Kicking

Field goals made

Field goal percentage
Minimum of 25 attempts for career records and 10 attempts for single-season records.

References

Boise State